Green Acres, Oregon or Greenacres, Oregon may refer to:

Green Acres, Coos County, Oregon
Green Acres, Douglas County, Oregon